Ulala Session is a South Korean boy band that rose to fame after winning the 2011 television talent show Superstar K 3. The group currently consists of members Kim Myung-hoon, Park Seung-il, Choe Do-wo. The group originally included Lim Yoon-taek, who died from gastric cancer in 2013, and Park Kwang-sun, who left after enlisting in the military in 2015. Choe Do-won and Ha Jun-seok joined the group in 2016.

Career
Prior to their appearance on Superstar K3, the group was not widely known in South Korea, performing "anywhere, even in the middle of a schoolyard if there was a stage."

During Superstar K3, audiences responded particularly fondly to lead singer Lim's battle with stomach cancer. This led to some speculation that Ulala Session was making up the story of Lim's cancer as a way to garner sympathy during the competition; Lim responded in July 2012 by bringing his doctor on SBS's One Night in TV Entertainment to confirm the diagnosis.

On 11 February 2013, Lim Yoon-taek, leader of Ulala Session, died from gastric cancer.

Discography

Studio albums

Extended plays

Singles

Soundtrack appearances

Other charted songs

References

South Korean boy bands
Superstar K winners